Chen Wei (born in Tianjin, China; he is also known as Wei Chen) is a former baseball pitcher who was most notable for being on China's roster for the 2009 World Baseball Classic. He also appeared in the 2006 Haarlem Baseball Week, allowing two runs in one inning of work. In December, 2008, he signed a player development contract with the Yokohama BayStars.

He did not actually play in the World Baseball Classic.

References

1983 births
2009 World Baseball Classic players
Baseball players from Tianjin
Chinese baseball players
Chinese expatriate baseball players in Japan
Living people
Nippon Professional Baseball pitchers
Yokohama BayStars players